Guavaween was an annual Latin-flavored Halloween celebration which took place on the last Saturday of October in the historic neighborhood of Ybor City on Tampa, Florida. It was named after Tampa's nickname, "The Big Guava".

Since its inception more than 30 years ago, Guavaween became one of the largest festivals in Ybor. The daylight hours were family-oriented and in the past had included such activities as a costume contest, scavenger hunt, safe trick-or-treat at Centro Ybor, food and amusement rides. Around dusk the Mama Guava Stumble Parade, Guavaween's most popular attraction, made its way down Seventh Avenue, the main street in Ybor. The parade, led by Mama Guava, featured floats and costumed individuals who threw candy and beads to the spectators.

History

Historical roots

In the 1880s, Spanish-born and New York-based Gavino Gutierrez came to the area to search for wild guava trees that might be cultivated commercially. He didn't find usable trees, but he liked the small town of Tampa. After leaving the area, Gutierrez stopped by Key West to visit his friend, cigar manufacturer Vicente Martinez-Ybor. Ybor was looking for a place to relocate his prosperous business, and Gutierrez recommended Tampa. Ybor took his advice and eventually founded Ybor City, helping Tampa grow from a small village to a bustling city over the next few decades.

Referencing this local history in the 1970s, local newspaper columnist Steve Otto planted the idea that if New York City is the "Big Apple", then Tampa must be the "Big Guava". The nickname stuck.

Early Guavaween
According to a well known area artist and college professor of art, prior to Mama Guava and Guavaween, many (then) young artists were sharing loft spaces in an old closed cigar factory in the late 1970s and decided to throw a large Halloween party and charge all who attended $1.00. The party was a success and the artists continued the party in subsequent years and the crowds grew as word spread. Somehow from the artist's original Halloween Parties, Guavaween s well as the first Artists and Writers Ball evolved. The first Artists and Writers Ball was given at the Cuban Club in their courtyard. The Tampa Tribune was the sponsor of that affair which featured many bands and entertainers. It was a giant success as people from all walks of life joined together, sharing tables, eating, drinking and dancing the night away.

The Artists and Writers Ball did not originally start from these Halloween Parties, but started as an underground alternative to Gasparilla. The Artists and Writers Group (Bud Lee, Peggy Lee, David Audet, Paul Wilborn, Beverly Coe and Bebe Williams) was the impetus behind The Artists and Writers Ball. It was traditionally held in early February around the time of Gasparilla.

The End of Guavaween 
Guavaween in its heyday reached an estimated attendance of 120,000 people but with that brought problems of property damage, arrests and medical emergencies.  The following year the area was enclosed by fencing to aid in crowd control.  Then in 1992 the Artists and Writers Ball who had co-sponsored the event parted ways with the Ybor Chamber of Commerce who was the other major sponsor. As the cost of the event increased and the funds decreased it was decided in 1995 to begin to charge admission.  The event continued to be strong with artists such as Rihanna performing in 2005 just of few months after the release in the USA of her first album in August. During these years the activity continued to struggle with its image with the attendees pushing the envelope on dress and behavior and the local chamber of commerce and the city council concerned about the image projected. At the same time the costs to host the activity continued to rise seeing the entry fee of $4 in 1994 increase to $17 in 2015.  As prices increased efforts were made to decrease expenses. The first step was to remove motorized vehicles from the parade in 2009 which allowed them to eliminate the barriers between the attendees and the parade for an estimated savings of $4,000.  2009 brought with it other changes as well, it had an attendance of only 15,000 people.  Using horses to draw the floats in 2009 simply did not prove effective and by 2012 the parade had been eliminated.  In 2015 the final death throes of Guavaween had started. The fencing came down and the entrance fee eliminated resulting it the elimination of the ability of attendee to consume alcohol since the city ban on drinking in the streets returned. The activity lost more patrons with this move and a loss of income from ticket sales. The last attempt to revitalize the event was the hiring of an outside event firm to organize the event.  They changed the activity from basically a street party attracting 10's of thousands to a music festival.  Part of the reasoning was the roots of the event stemmed for the ideas of the Artists and Writers Ball.  The event now changed from an outdoor activity to indoor music at selected locations throughout Ybor. Ticket prices now were $20 the day of the event and $85 for VIP tickets.  It also morphed to a strictly adult event since all venues served alcohol preventing anyone under 21 from attending which hurt attendance even more since in the past many of the attendees were local college students and other young adults. at this point attendance had dropped below 5,000. The contract signed with the event company was for 3 years, finishing in 2017.  In 2018 the official Guavaween website is available for purchase.  The last Facebook update was in 2016.

Events
The celebration attracted over 100,000 people from all over the world and not only featured the stumble parade, costume contest and live national and local concerts, but had become a full day of fun for folks of all ages. Guavaween Family FunFest filled the streets between 10:00 a.m. and 3:00 p.m. offering exciting activities for the young and old alike. Activities included a scavenger hunt, safe trick-or-treating, live music, food, rides, contests and the Children's Costume Contest and Parade.

For twenty years, the ornately decorated Mama Guava led her loyal band of followers and revelers in the Mama Guava Stumble Parade. Mama Guava claimed stake to "taking the 'bore' out of Ybor." After 4:00 p.m., Mama Guava welcomed her adult revelers and the evening party got under way. Guavaween was a party that acted as the primary fundraiser for the Ybor City Chamber of Commerce. Guavaween served to preserve Tampa's oldest city.

It was quite common for both adults and children to attend Guavaween in costume. Things tended to become more risqué during the evening hours. Parking could be extremely difficult in Ybor during Guavaween. Shuttle buses ran from Florida State Fairgrounds, Raymond James Stadium, Tampa Port Authority, and University of South Florida Sun Dome.

References

Photos of day activities
Guavaween Kids Day Activities

External links
Official Guavaween Site

Festivals in Tampa, Florida
Halloween events in the United States